The Oklahoma City Lightning is a full-contact women's American football team in the Women's Spring Football League based in Oklahoma City, Oklahoma. Home games are played at Taft Stadium.

Formerly a member of the Independent Women's Football League in their inaugural season of 2002, and then the National Women's Football Association from 2003 until 2008, they have made the playoffs in six of seven seasons played so far, losing four times in the Conference Championship Game (two to the Pensacola Power in 2003 and 2005 and once to the Austin Outlaws in 2002 and the Columbus Comets in 2007) and losing twice in the NWFA Championship Game (to the Detroit Demolition in 2004 and to the D.C. Divas in 2006).

After sitting out the 2009 season, the Lightning were blown out 62-0 by the Lone Star Mustangs in their first game of 2010.  The following week, the Lightning left the WFA and almost folded, however, they have since joined the Women's Spring Football League, where they will play the remainder of 2010 and beyond.

Season-By-Season 

|-
| colspan="6" align="center" | Oklahoma City Lightning (IWFL)
|-
|2002 || 5 || 3 || 0 || 3rd Western || --
|-
| colspan="6" align="center" | Oklahoma City Lightning (NWFA)
|-
|2003 || 7 || 1 || 0 || 1st South Midwest || Won Southern Conference Quarterfinal (Nashville)Won Southern Conference Semifinal (Chattanooga)Lost Southern Conference Championship (Pensacola) 
|-
|2004 || 8 || 0 || 0 || 1st South Southwest || First-Round Bye in Southern Conference Quarterfinal Won Southern Conference Semifinal (Kansas City)Won Southern Conference Championship (Pensacola)Lost NWFA Championship (Detroit)
|-
|2005 || 7 || 1 || 0 || 3rd South || Won Southern Division Quarterfinal (New Orleans)Won Southern Conference Semifinal (Nashville)Lost Southern Conference Championship (Pensacola)
|-
|2006 || 8 || 0 || 0 || 1st South West || First-Round Bye in NWFA First Round Won NWFA Quarterfinal (Cleveland)Won NWFA Semifinal (Mass.)Lost NWFA Championship (D.C.)
|-
|2007 || 7 || 1 || 0 || 1st South West || Won Southern Conference Quarterfinal (New Orleans)Won Southern Conference Semifinal (St. Louis)Lost Southern Conference Championship (Columbus)
|-
|2008 || 6 || 2 || 0 || 2nd South Central || Lost Southern Conference Quarterfinal (H-Town)
|-
| colspan="6" align="center" | Oklahoma City Lightning (WFA)
|-
|2009 || colspan="6" rowspan="1" align="center" | Did Not Play
|-
|2010 || 0 || 2 || 0 || -- || --
|-
| colspan="6" align="center" | Oklahoma City Lightning (WSFL)
|-
|2010 || -- || 1 || -- || -- || --
|-
|2011 || -- || -- || -- || -- || --
|-
!Totals || 58 || 16 || 0
|colspan="2"| (including playoffs)

2010 Season Schedule

** = Forfeited

References

External links
Oklahoma City Lightning

Women's Spring Football League teams
Sports in Oklahoma City
American football teams in Oklahoma
American football teams established in 2002
2002 establishments in Oklahoma
Women's sports in Oklahoma